Skykomish is a town in King County, Washington, United States. The population was 198 as of the 2010 census, down from an estimated peak of "several thousand" in the 1920s.

Located in the Mount Baker-Snoqualmie National Forest, 49 miles east of Everett, Washington, on the South Fork of the Skykomish River, Skykomish was founded as a railroad town. Today, it is mainly a stopping point for recreational access to the surrounding mountains, including skiing at nearby Stevens Pass.

Being located in the far northeastern corner of King County, mountains deny Skykomish any road access to the rest of the county. Instead, U.S. Highway 2 (known in the area as the Cascade Highway) connects it with Snohomish County to the north and through Stevens Pass (17 miles east of town) to Chelan County.

History
The name "Skykomish" derives from the Skykomish or Skai-whamish tribe (originally considered a subdivision of the Snoqualmies) who inhabited the area before European settlement. The townsite was settled in 1889 by John Maloney, a guide for the surveying team on the Great Northern Railway. The town of Skykomish was officially incorporated on June 5, 1909.

From the 1890s to 1974, Skykomish was a maintenance and fueling station for the Great Northern Railway, which eventually became part of the Burlington Northern Railroad, and presently the BNSF Railway.  It was also once the western terminus for electric operations (1928–56) on the Cascade Tunnel route all the way to Wenatchee.  Here, steam or diesel locomotives were changed or coupled to electric locomotives. The town gained a public library in 1945, operated by the King County Rural Library District and located in the city hall. It was replaced with a separate building in 1994. Skykomish's population peaked at around 8,000 in the 1920s and shrank to under 300 by 1990 due to the loss of businesses and jobs.

Waste disposal practices, common during that era, resulted in the contamination of its soil, its groundwater, and the Skykomish River by oil and heavy metals. BNSF (then BN) and the Washington State Department of Ecology began remediation discussions in the mid-1980s, and in 2006, agreed to a plan whereby the railroad would pay up to $50 million to clean up the area over a three-year period (completed in 2009). This effort involved massive excavations—essentially removing the contaminated soil and replacing it with clean soil—and the rebuilding of a levee. (The eventual total cost of the cleanup exceeded $100 million.)

Twenty two of Skykomish's buildings — both homes and business — were temporarily moved during the cleanup process.  After the contaminated soil under them was removed, the buildings were moved back to their original locations on new foundations and utilities connections. The town was restored with modern conveniences such as sidewalks and street lights, but the historic character of Skykomish was maintained. The greatest benefit of the cleanup to every resident and business in town was the installation of the new Waste Water Treatment system connected to every building.

Geography
Skykomish is located at  (47.710048, -121.355695).

Climate

Demographics

2010 census
As of the census of 2010, there were 198 people, 95 households, and 45 families living in the town. The racial makeup of the town was 95.5% White, 1.0% African American, 1.5% Native American, 1.5% Asian, and 0.5% from two or more races. Hispanic or Latino of any race were 1.5% of the population.

There were 95 households, of which 20.0% had children under the age of 18 living with them, 34.7% were married couples living together, 4.2% had a female householder with no husband present, 8.4% had a male householder with no wife present, and 52.6% were non-families. 44.2% of all households were made up of individuals, and 14.7% had someone living alone who was 65 years of age or older. The average household size was 2.08 and the average family size was 2.87.

The median age in the town was 51.3 years. 18.2% of residents were under the age of 18; 6.1% were between the ages of 18 and 24; 18.7% were from 25 to 44; 38.4% were from 45 to 64; and 18.7% were 65 years of age or older. The gender makeup of the town was 57.1% male and 42.9% female.

2000 census
As of the census of 2000, there were 214 people, 104 households, and 58 families living in the town. The population density was 623.2 people per square mile (243.0/km2). There were 162 housing units at an average density of 471.8 per square mile (184.0/km2). The racial makeup of the town was 94.39% White, 0.47% African American, 1.40% Native American, 0.93% Asian, and 2.80% from two or more races. Hispanics or Latinos of any race were 2.80% of the population.

There were 104 households, of which 20.2% had children under the age of 18 living with them. 48.1% were married couples living together, 2.9% had a female householder with no husband present, and 44.2% were non-families. 34.6% of all households were made up of individuals, and 17.3% had someone living alone who was 65 years of age or older. The average household size was 2.06 and the average family size was 2.66.

18.2% of the town's population was under the age of 18, 5.1% from 18 to 24, 23.8% from 25 to 44, 34.1% from 45 to 64, and 18.7% 65 or older. The median age was 46 years. For every 100 females, there were 96.3 males. For every 100 females age 18 and over, there were 103.5 males.

The median income for a household in the town was $45,357, and the median income for a family was $48,500. Males had a median income of $42,500 versus $25,938 for females. The per capita income for the town was $22,829. About 3.0% of families and 9.0% of the population were below the poverty line, including 8.6% of those under the age of 18 and none of those 65 or over.

References

External links

 Official town website
 Skykomish Historical Society

Towns in King County, Washington
Towns in Washington (state)
1909 establishments in Washington (state)